The men's tournament in American football at the 2017 World Games in Wrocław was played between 22 and 24 July. 172 American football competitors, from 4 nations, participated in the tournament. The American football competition took place at Olympic Stadium.

Team USA situation 

Following the 2015 split between IFAF Paris and IFAF New York, IFAF Paris expelled USA Football in 2017. USA Football was replaced by the United States Federation of American Football in Paris, while New York retained USA Football as their active member. Since IFAF Paris was recognized by the IWGA and International Olympic Committee at the time, the United States Federation of American Football was permitted to organize the United States national American football team for the 2017 World Games.

Players, mainly professional Americans playing in Europe, were chosen for the team on May 31, 2017. Players were promised full funding from the United States Federation of American Football; however, the funding was withdrawn just days before the competition and players had to provide their own transportation to Wroclaw. As a result, most of the team withdrew from the competition and were instead replaced by volunteers who were already in Europe at the time. Most of the team arrived the day before their opening match vs the Germany national American football team. The Americans lost to Germany 13–14, which was the first loss ever for a United States national American football team in international competition.

Qualification

Rosters

Venue

Knockout stage 
All times are Central European Summer Time (UTC+02:00)

Bracket

Semifinals

United States v Germany

Poland v France

Bronze medal match

Gold medal match

Final standing

Medalist

References 

Tournament summary
Medalists

External links 
 Result on IWGA website

Men's tournament